Risus sardonicus or rictus grin is a highly characteristic, abnormal, sustained spasm of the facial muscles that appears to produce grinning. It may be caused by tetanus, strychnine poisoning, or Wilson's disease, and has been reported after judicial hanging.

The condition's name, associated with the Mediterranean island of Sardinia, derives from the appearance of raised eyebrows and an open "grin", which can appear sardonic or malevolent to the lay observer, displayed by those experiencing these muscle spasms.

Causes
It is most often observed as a sign of tetanus. It can also be caused by poisoning with strychnine or Wilson's disease.

In 2009, scientists at the University of Eastern Piedmont wrote that they had identified hemlock water-dropwort (Oenanthe crocata) as the plant historically responsible for producing the sardonic grin. This plant is the most likely candidate for the "sardonic herb", which was a neurotoxic plant used for the ritual killing of elderly people in pre-Roman Nuragic Sardinia.

See also
 Sardonicism
  Trismus
 Mr. Sardonicus
 The Man Who Laughs (1928 film)
 Twelve Dreams of Dr. Sardonicus, a 1970 music album by Spirit
 Joker (character)
 Smile (2022 film)

References

Facial expressions
Laughter
Tetanus
Strychnine poisoning